Peeter is a masculine given name, a cognate of the name Peter. It exists in Estonian, Flemish and Dutch languages.
The Flemish/Dutch name may also be written as Pieter and occasionally translated as Peter.

Notable people with the given name include:

Estonian
Peeter All (1829–1898), Estonian fisherman, ship captain, ship owner and salvage diver 
Peeter Allik (1966–2019), Estonian surrealist artist
Peeter Baranin (1882–1966), Estonian politician
Peeter Ernits (born 1953), Estonian zoologist, journalist and politician
Peeter Helme (born 1978), Estonian writer
Peeter Hoppe (born on 1960), Estonian Brigadier General
Peeter Jakobi (born 1940), Estonian actor
Peeter Jakobson (1854–1899), Estonian writer 
Peeter Jalakas (born 1961), Estonian theatre director, producer, playwright and restaurateur
Peeter Järvelaid (born 1957), Estonian legal scholar and historian
Peeter Kaldur (born 1954), Estonian Lutheran clergyman
Peeter Kard (1940–2006), Estonian actor
Peeter Karu (1909–1942), Estonian sport shooter
Peeter Kõpp (1888–1960), Estonian agronomist, politician and professor
Peeter Kreitzberg (1948–2011), Estonian politician
Peeter Kümmel (born 1982), Estonian cross-country skier and Olympic competitor
Peeter Lamp (born 1944), Estonian tennis player and coach 
Peeter Laurits (born 1962), Estonian artist and photographer
Peeter Laurson (born 1971), Estonian chemist, economist and politician 
Peeter Lepp (born 1943), Estonian politician
Peeter Lilje (1950–1993), Estonian conductor
Peeter Luksep (1955–2015), Swedish politician
Peeter Malvet (1907–1978), Estonian military soldier, jurist and politician
Peeter Mardna (born 1938), Estonian rower, coach and physician
Peeter Mudist (1942–2013) Estonian painter, sculptor and print-maker
Peeter Mürk (1911–1974), Estonian weightlifter
Peeter Nelis (born 1953), Estonian fencer and coach
Peeter Oja (born 1960), Estonian actor, singer, comedian and media personality
Peeter Olesk (born 1953), Estonian literary scholar and politician
Peeter Olesk (born 1993), Estonian sport shooter
Peeter Päkk (born 1957), Estonian sports shooter 
Peeter Pere (born 1957), Estonian architect and artist
Peeter Põld (1878–1930), Estonian pedagogic scientist, school director and politician
Peeter Rahnel (born 1957), Estonian politician
Peeter Rebane (born 1973), Estonian film director, producer and entrepreneur
Peeter Saan (born 1959), Estonian conductor and military officer
Peeter Sauter (born 1962), Estonian author and actor
Peeter Simm (born 1953), Estonian film director
Peeter Süda (1883–1920), Estonian organist, composer and collector of Estonian folksongs
Peeter Tali (born 1964), Estonian military officer and journalist
Peeter Tarvas (1916–1987), Estonian architect and professor
Peeter Tammearu (born 1964), Estonian actor and theatre director
Peeter Tooming (1939–1997), Estonian photographer, documentary film director and journalist
Peeter Torop (born 1950), Estonian semiotician and scientist
Peeter Tulviste (1945–2017), Estonian psychologist, educator and politician
Peeter Turnau (born 1994), Estonian fencer
Peeter Urbla (born 1945), Estonian film director, producer and screenwriter
Peeter Vähi (born 1955), Estonian composer
Peeter Volkonski (born 1954), Estonian actor, rock-musician and composer
Peeter Volmer (1940–2002), Estonian singer and actor 
Peeter Võsa (born 1967), Estonian journalist, television presenter and politician
Peeter Võsu (born 1958), Estonian politician

Flemish / Dutch
Peeter Gijsels (1621–1690), Flemish Baroque painter
Peeter Sion 
Peeter Baltens
Peeter Symons
Gaspar Peeter Verbruggen the Younger
Peeter Cornet
Jan Peeter Verdussen
Peeter van Bredael
Gaspar Peeter Verbruggen the Elder
Peter Franchoys
Pieter Snyers
Jan Peeter van Bredael the Elder
Pieter Boel
Peeter van Loon
Pieter Verdussen
Pieter Meert
Peeter van Aelst (disambiguation)
Pieter Verbrugghen I
Pieter van Bloemen
Peter Snayers
Jan Pieter van Bredael the Younger
Peter Frans Casteels
Pieter Stalpaert 
Jan Pieter Brueghel 
Pieter Jan Snyers
Peter Vanden Gheyn (disambiguation)
Peter I Vanden Gheyn
Pieter van Aelst (17th century)
Peter IV Vanden Gheyn
Pieter Bout 
Pieter Scheemaeckers
Pieter van Aelst (disambiguation)
Peter Danckerts de Rij
Petrus Phalesius the Elder
Pieter Meulener
Pieter Faes
Pieter Hardimé 
Pieter van der Borcht (III)
Pieter Stevens II

See also

References

Estonian masculine given names